Hexomyza is a genus of flies belonging to the family Agromyzidae.

Species
Species include:
 Hexomyza abutilonicaulis''''
 Hexomyza caraganae Hexomyza centaureae Hexomyza gymnosporivora Hexomyza halimodendronis Hexomyza paederiae Hexomyza sarothamni (Hendel, 1923)
 Hexomyza schineri  (Giraud, 1861)
 Hexomyza simplicoides'' (Hendel, 1920)

References

Agromyzidae
Opomyzoidea genera
Muscomorph flies of Europe
Taxa named by Günther Enderlein